Miroslav Ćurčić (Serbian Cyrillic: Мирослав Ћурчић; 22 March 1962 – 10 August 2017) was a Serbian footballer.

During his playing career he played for FK Novi Sad in the Yugoslav Second League, FK Vojvodina in the Yugoslav First League, Royal Antwerp FC in the Belgian First Division, S.C. Farense, Belenenses and G.D. Estoril-Praia in the Portuguese Liga and SG Egelsbach in the German lower leagues.

Ćurčić died on 10 August 2017 in Germany.

References

External links
 
 Stats from Yugoslav Leagues at Zerodic.com

1962 births
2017 deaths
Sportspeople from Zrenjanin
Serbian footballers
Yugoslav footballers
RFK Novi Sad 1921 players
FK Vojvodina players
Yugoslav First League players
Royal Antwerp F.C. players
Belgian Pro League players
Expatriate footballers in Belgium
S.C. Farense players
C.F. Os Belenenses players
G.D. Estoril Praia players
Primeira Liga players
Serbian expatriate footballers
Expatriate footballers in Portugal
Expatriate footballers in Germany
Association football forwards